Orinda Dale Evans (born April 23, 1943) is an inactive Senior United States district judge of the United States District Court for the Northern District of Georgia.

Early life and education

Born in Savannah, Georgia, Evans received an Artium Baccalaureus degree from Duke University in 1965 and a Juris Doctor from Emory University School of Law in 1968.

Career 
She was in private practice in Atlanta, Georgia from 1968 to 1979. She served as counsel to the Atlanta Crime Commission from 1970 to 1971, and was an adjunct professor of law at Emory from 1974 to 1977.

Federal judicial service

On June 5, 1979, Evans was nominated by President Jimmy Carter to a seat on the United States District Court for the Northern District of Georgia vacated by Judge Albert John Henderson. She was confirmed by the United States Senate on July 23, 1979, and received her commission on July 24, 1979. She served as Chief Judge from 1999 to 2006, when Judge Jack Tarpley Camp Jr. became Chief Judge. Evans assumed senior status on December 31, 2008. She assumed inactive senior status on September 30, 2020.

Notable cases

On February 14, 2008, Evans sentenced tax protester Sherry Jackson to four consecutive prison terms of 12 months each.

On May 11, 2012, Evans decided the Cambridge University Press v. Becker case, ultimately determining that Georgia State University was the prevailing party and awarding attorneys' fees to GSU from the plaintiffs (Oxford University Press, Cambridge University Press, and SAGE Publications).

References

Sources
 
 
 

1943 births
Living people
People from Savannah, Georgia
Duke University alumni
Emory University School of Law alumni
Judges of the United States District Court for the Northern District of Georgia
United States district court judges appointed by Jimmy Carter
20th-century American judges
Emory University faculty
21st-century American judges
20th-century American women judges
21st-century American women judges